The 1997 Iowa State Cyclones football team represented Iowa State University during the 1997 NCAA Division I-A football season.  They played their home games at Jack Trice Stadium in Ames, Iowa. They participated as members of the Big 12 Conference in the North Division.  The team was coached by head coach Dan McCarney.

Schedule

References

Iowa State
Iowa State Cyclones football seasons
Iowa State Cyclones football